Lavandula nimmoi is a species of flowering plant in the family Lamiaceae. It is found only in Arabian Peninsula.

References

nimmoi
Endemic flora of Socotra
Least concern plants
Taxonomy articles created by Polbot